Henry Clay Loudenslager (May 22, 1852 – August 12, 1911) was an American Republican Party politician from New Jersey who represented the 1st congressional district from 1893 to 1911.

Biography
Loudenslager was born in Mauricetown, New Jersey (now part of Commercial Township) on May 22, 1852. He moved with his parents to Paulsboro, New Jersey in 1856, where he attended the common schools. He engaged in the produce commission business in Philadelphia from 1872 to 1882, and was county clerk of Gloucester County, New Jersey from 1882 to 1892.

Loudenslager was elected as a Republican to the Fifty-third and to the nine succeeding Congresses and served from March 4, 1893, until his death in Paulsboro on August 12, 1911. He was chairman of the Committee on Pensions (Fifty-fourth through Sixty-first Congresses). He was interred in Eglington Cemetery in Clarksboro.

See also
List of United States Congress members who died in office (1900–49)

Notes

External links

Henry Clay Loudenslager at The Political Graveyard

Henry C. Loudenslager, late a representative from New Jersey, Memorial addresses delivered in the House of Representatives and Senate frontispiece 1913

1852 births
1911 deaths
Politicians from Gloucester County, New Jersey
Republican Party members of the New Jersey General Assembly
People from Commercial Township, New Jersey
People from Paulsboro, New Jersey
Pennsylvania Republicans
Republican Party members of the United States House of Representatives from New Jersey
19th-century American politicians